Ovitipana is a small town in Sri Lanka. It is located within Southern Province. Ovitipana has a population of 21,481,334  and an approximate population for 7 km radius from this point: 76017

See also

External links

References

Populated places in Southern Province, Sri Lanka